The White WW-1 Der Jäger D.IX also called the Stolp-White WW-1 Der Jäger D.IX/69 is an American homebuilt biplane.

Design and development
The WW-1 Der Jäger D.IX is a single seated, single engine, biplane with conventional landing gear. It is based on the Stolp SA-500 Starlet design. The fuselage is welded steel tubing and wings use spruce wood spars with aircraft fabric covering used throughout. The wings are covered using a scalloped trailing edge pattern.

Operational history
Kermit Weeks built a Der Jäger D.IX as his first homebuilt aircraft. His aircraft is on display at the Fantasy of Flight museum in Florida.

Specifications (White WW-1 Der Jäger D.IX)

See also

References

Homebuilt aircraft